Regine Hildebrandt (née Radischewski; 26 April 1941 – 26 November 2001) was a German biologist and politician (Social Democratic Party of Germany).

Life

Early years

Wartime in Germany
Regine Radischewski was born in Berlin during the war, the second of her parents' two recorded children. Her father was a pianist who worked as an accompanist at the National Ballet Academy.

Her mother would later own a small tobacconist shop. When she was two the family were evacuated from central Berlin to countryside far to the east of Germany, and shortly after that they were bombed out, losing most of their material possessions.

Growing up
The war ended in May 1945 and the family ended up back in Berlin.   For the first five or six years of her schooling she attended a school in a western occupation zone of the city ("West Berlin"), but as the political division between the Soviet occupation zone and the western occupation zones became more stark and, it seemed, more permanent, her parents opted on her behalf for a school in the Soviet zone in what had by now become known as East Berlin.   The family home was in the city centre along Bernauer Straße ("Bernau Street") which formed the (initially hard to spot) political border between East Berlin and West Berlin, and afforded Regine a ring-side seat in the cold wall drama until September 1961 when the family were forcibly relocated in connection with the building of the Berlin Wall.  In October 1961 she co-founded and joined the interdenominational choir at Berlin's (Protestant) Cathedral, which now flourished under the musical direction of a man called Herbert Hildebrand.

Middle years

The student
From 1959 to 1964, she studied  biology at the Humboldt University in East Berlin.

She had never joined the Free German Youth (FDJ/Freie Deutsche Jugend), which was in effect the youth wing of the young country's ruling SED party. Her failure to join seems to have been a result of timetable clashes involving her commitment to singing in the church choir. Failure to enroll in the FDJ had nevertheless led to her application for the university course to be initially rejected; and subsequent failure as an adult to become a Party Member would constrain her career opportunities right up until 1989.

A career in research
Between 1964 and 1978 Regine Radischewski worked in a management position involving Quality Control in the pharmacology department of VEB Berlin-Chemie, a major conglomerate in East Berlin. Hildebrandt combined her responsibilities in the pharmaceuticals department with a medicines research project at the Humboldt University which led to her receiving her doctorate in 1978.  In 1978 she took a senior research position at Berlin's Centre for the Study of Metabolism Illnesses and Diabetes, heading up the Diabetes department until 1990. During this period she had numerous research papers published.

Family matters
During these years she also found time, in 1966 to marry Jörg Hildebrandt, brother of the musical director of the choir in which they sang.   The two had known each other through the church since 1950:  they had also been near neighbours, with a shared childhood experience of living along the East–West front-line before 1961.  The marriage produced three children, born in 1969, 1971 and 1974.   Her research career left her with enough space to devote time to the family, which was very important to her.   Her husband later recalled that they ate together each evening six days per week, and on Sundays had a family lunch in the middle of the day after getting back from church.   When she died, aged 60, she would still be living with younger family members in a large "multi-generational family house" they had been able to have built after 1990.

Interaction with the state

The family participated the political life of the  one-party dictatorship only when they felt they had to. They did not vote in the country's sham elections because §22 of the constitution did not oblige them to vote (although the 1986 General election resulted, typically, in a reported turnout of 99.74%).   Regine Hildebrand did join the national Trade Union Federation (FDGB/Freier Deutscher Gewerkschaftsbund) because not to have done so would have deprived her research colleagues of vital funding.   When fraternal tanks appeared on the streets of Prague to crush political reform, the Hildebrandts joined in a protest demonstration outside the Czechoslovak embassy in Berlin.

They would write letters of protest to the Party Central Committee and to Neues Deutschland, the party's mass-circulation official daily newspaper. Hildebrand assiduously read Neues Deutschland and followed other official media, if only to keep herself up to date with The Party's politically correct linguistic contrivances of the moment.  The family never owned a television set, but news came from radio programmes broadcast from West Berlin or London, and from friends who visited from the west and were permitted (unlike East German citizens) to return to the west afterwards.

Politics
The summer of 1989 brought a dramatic change in her life when she, together with her husband, Jörg, was among the co-founders of Democracy Now, which sought an alliance of Christians and critical Marxists "to think about our future, to think about a society based on solidarity".

The Social Democrats
On 12 October 1989 she joined the Social Democratic Party (SPD) which (in East Germany) had been re-founded five days earlier.   The Hildebrandts valued the embracing compassionate socialism of the moderate left which had been nurtured and demonstrated by iconic (western) SPD figures from the recent past such as Kurt Schumacher and Willy Brandt.   A year later, following reunification, in October 1990 the party would merge formally with the West German Social Democratic Party (SDP).

National ministerial office
1990 was the year in which, for rather less than a year, she became an important Social Democratic participant in the national politics of the German Democratic Republic (GDR).   National elections in the GDR had traditionally operated according to a single list system which offered the voters only one list of (carefully preselected) candidates.  Anyone wishing to vote against the list could do so by placing the ballot paper in a separate ballot box while the officials looked on:  few did.   But on 18 March 1990 the German Democratic Republic conducted its first (and as matters turned out, last) democratically configured general election.  The Social Democrats took 21.9% of the vote which entitled them to 88 seats in the country's first freely elected National legislative assembly (Volkskammer). One of the seats went to Hildebrand, representing the Berlin electoral district. She also joined the coalition government of Lothar de Maizière, serving between April and August 1990 as the East German Minister for Labour and Social Affairs.

A political decision had been taken to convert East German currency into western Marks at a one-for one rate (except in respect of very large amounts), and Hildebrandt's priority as a government minister was tackling growing unemployment in east Germany, following economic disruption associated with the ongoing reunification process.

The governing coalition started to splinter in August 1990 leading to the withdrawal of the Social Democrats from it, as a result of which Regine Hildebrandt terminated her career as a government minister at the national level. The next month, however, in 1990 she was elected to the national committee of the SPD (for the whole of Germany, even though national reunification would not be formally enacted until October).

Minister in Brandenburg
Hildebrandt now became a key SPD figure in the state politics of Brandenburg. In October 1990, the state tier of government was reintroduced to what had been the German Democratic Republic, and as part of the process elections took place for a new state parliament in Brandenburg on 26 October. Hildebrandt was elected as an SPD member and then appointed to ministerial office under minister-president Manfred Stolpe: from 1 November 1990 onwards she served as Brandenburg's Minister for Labour, Social affairs, Health and Women, in effect an expanded version of the ministerial portfolio she had been handling nationally earlier in the year.

She was a popular and effective minister, often hitting the headlines with less than diplomatic outbursts, always charmingly reasonable but also forcefully persuasive with key colleagues when, as often happened, issues within her ministerial ambit came down to arguments about funding. In the popular media she frequently attracted the soubriquet "Mother Courage".

In the 1999 Brandenburg state election the Social Democrats lost their absolute majority and minister-president Manfred Stolpe prepared to form a "grand coalition" with the centre-right CDU party. Hildebrand was already seriously ill and had strongly campaigned for an alternative alliance, with the left-wing PDS. She resigned from the state government.

The Hildebrandts and the state prime minister Manfred Stolpe had known one another since the 1960s through their church connections, though they had not been aware at every level of Stolpe's complicated and possibly at times collaborative relationship with the Ministry for State Security during the years of the dictatorship. After her resignation from the government Hildebrand and Stolpe would continue to treasure one another's friendship, and remain political allies, until Hildebrandt's death in 2001.

Nationally in December 1999 and again in November 2001, a few weeks before she died, Hildebrand topped the polls in the elections to the national executive of the Social Democratic Party.

Death
In July 1996 it became known that Regine Hildebrandt had breast cancer. She died at age 60 on 26 November 2001 in Woltersdorf, Brandenburg.

Honours and awards
1993: Gustav Heinemann Citizenship Prize
1993: Hamm Brücher Medal
1997: "Golden Hen"
2000: Fritz Bauer Prize
2001: Order of Merit of the Federal Republic of Germany

References

External links

1941 births
2001 deaths
Deaths from breast cancer
20th-century German biologists
German Lutherans
Humboldt University of Berlin alumni
Politicians from Berlin
Deaths from cancer in Germany
Ministers of the Brandenburg State Government
Commanders Crosses of the Order of Merit of the Federal Republic of Germany
Scientists from Berlin
East German scientists
East German women
Women ministers of State Governments in Germany
Members of the Landtag of Brandenburg
20th-century German women politicians
21st-century German women politicians
20th-century biologists
20th-century Lutherans
People from East Berlin